is a railway station in the city of Yonezawa, Yamagata Prefecture, Japan, operated by East Japan Railway Company (JR East).

Lines
Oitama Station is served by the Ōu Main Line, and is located 45.6 rail kilometers from the terminus of the line at Fukushima Station.

Station layout
The station has two opposed side platforms connected via a footbridge; however, only one platform is in use. The station is unattended.

Platforms

History
Oitama Station opened on December 20, 1917. The station was absorbed into the JR East network upon the privatization of JNR on April 1, 1987.

Surrounding area
 Mogami River

See also
List of Railway Stations in Japan

External links

 JR East Station information 

Stations of East Japan Railway Company
Railway stations in Yamagata Prefecture
Ōu Main Line
Railway stations in Japan opened in 1917
Yonezawa, Yamagata